Petra Rohrmann (born 30 July 1962 in Zella-Mehlis, Bezirk Suhl) is an East German cross-country skier who competed from 1983 to 1984. At the 1984 Winter Olympics in Sarajevo, she finished eighth in the 4 × 5 km relay and had her best individual finish was 17th in the 10 km event at those same games.

Rohrmann's best World Cup career finish was seventh in a 20 km event in the Soviet Union in 1983.

Cross-country skiing results
All results are sourced from the International Ski Federation (FIS).

Olympic Games

World Cup

Season standings

References

External links

Women's 4 x 5 km cross-country relay Olympic results: 1976-2002 

1962 births
Living people
People from Zella-Mehlis
People from Bezirk Suhl
German female cross-country skiers
Sportspeople from Thuringia
Cross-country skiers at the 1984 Winter Olympics
20th-century German women